DNA-directed RNA polymerase III subunit RPC9 is an enzyme that in humans is encoded by the CRCP gene.

This gene encodes a membrane protein that functions as part of a receptor complex for a small neuropeptide that increases intracellular cAMP levels. Alternate transcriptional splice variants, encoding different isoforms, have been characterized.

References

Further reading